(The) Definitive Collection may refer to:

The Definitive Collection (ABBA album), 2001
The Definitive Collection (Australian Crawl & James Reyne album), 2002
The Definitive Collection (A Life in Music), an album by Cilla Black, 2009
The Definitive Collection (Cameo album), 2006
The Definitive Collection (Eric Carmen album), 1997
The Definitive Collection (Eliza Carthy album), 2003
Definitive Collection (Tony Christie album), 2005
The Definitive Collection (Terri Clark album)
The Definitive Collection (Patsy Cline album)
The Definitive Collection (Billy Ray Cyrus album), 2004
The Definitive Collection (Deadstar album)
The Definitive Collection (DeBarge album)
The Definitive Collection, the 2007 reissue of His Best by Bo Diddley
Definitive Collection (Donovan album), 1995
Definitive Collection (Electric Light Orchestra album)
Definitive Collection (Europe album), 1997 
The Definitive Collection (Foreigner album), 2006
Definitive Collection (Nina Hagen album), 1995
The Definitive Collection (Cissy Houston album), 2000
The Definitive Collection, the 2007 reissue of His Best by Howlin' Wolf
The Definitive Collection (Humble Pie album), 2006
The Definitive Collection (Michael Jackson album)
The Definitive Collection (Kitarō album)
The Definitive Collection (Level 42 album), 2006 
The Definitive Collection (Little River Band album)
The Definitive Collection (Jeff Lorber album), 2000
The Definitive Collection (Olivia Newton-John album), 2001 
The Definitive Collection (Alan Parsons album), 1997
The Definitive Collection (Partridge Family album), 2001
The Definitive Collection (Sandi Patty album)
The Definitive Collection (Elvis Presley album)
The Definitive Collection (Lou Reed album), 1999
The Definitive Collection (Lionel Richie album)
The Definitive Collection (Archie Roach album), 2004
The Definitive Collection (Diana Ross album), 2006
The Definitive Collection (Santana album)
The Definitive Collection, an album by Neil Sedaka
The Definitive Collection (The Sports album), 2004
The Definitive Collection (The Supremes album), 2008
The Definitive Collection (Rachid Taha album)
The Definitive Collection, an album by The Temptations, 2008
The Definitive Collection (Thin Lizzy album), 2006
The Definitive Collection (Ernest Tubb album), 2006
The Definitive Collection (Bonnie Tyler album)
The Definitive Collection (Whitesnake album)
The Definitive Collection (Edgar Winter album), 2016
The Definitive Collection (Stevie Wonder album) 2002
Led Zeppelin Definitive Collection, 2008
Step Back in Time: The Definitive Collection, an album by Kylie Minogue, 2019

See also
The Ultimate Collection (disambiguation)